The 2004 UCI Road World Championships took place in Verona, Italy, between 27 September and 3 October 2004. The event consisted of a road race and a time trial for men, women, men under 23, junior men and junior women.

Events summary 

 
UCI Road World Championships by year
World Championships
Uci Road World Championships
International cycle races hosted by Italy